Tenjo is a municipality and town of Colombia in the Central Savanna Province, part of the department of Cundinamarca. Tenjo is part of the Metropolitan Area of Bogotá and borders Chía, Madrid, Tabio, Funza, Subachoque and Cota.

Etymology 
Tenjo in Muisca language literally translates "in the big mouth".

History 
The area of Tenjo was inhabited by the Muisca in the times before the Spanish conquest. Tenjo was ruled by the zipa based in Bacatá. Ancient rock art has been discovered in Tenjo.

Modern Tenjo was founded on April 8, 1603, by Diego Gómez de Mena. On the 7 of May, 1637, it was decided that the first church of the town was to be built by Alonso Serrano Hernández after being hired by Juan de Vera, Cristóbal Gómez de Silva, Juan de Orejuela and Juan de Artieda. The church was completed on August 17, 1645. By the year of 1778, there was a population of 1,009 people and 211 families, excluding 983 other native people who inhabited Tenjo.

Economy 
Tenjo's economy is mainly based on horticulture and livestock-breeding. Thanks to its relatively close position to Bogotá, Tenjo is starting to become part of its suburbs and with many schools being established here that have collaborated with this effect.

Sister cities 
 : Las Gabias

Born in Tenjo 
 Crisanto Luque Sánchez (1889–1959), cardinal of the Roman Catholic Church

Gallery

References 

Municipalities of Cundinamarca Department
Populated places established in 1603
1603 establishments in the Spanish Empire
Muisca Confederation
Muysccubun